Shahrak-e Janbazan (also Romanized as Shahrak-e Jānbāzān) is a village in Esfivard-e Shurab Rural District, in the Central District of Sari County, Mazandaran Province, Iran. At the 2006 census, its population was 558, in 120 families.

References 

Populated places in Sari County